Kurigram Stadium is located by the Kurigram-Chilmari Rd, Kurigram, Bangladesh.

See also
Stadiums in Bangladesh
List of football stadiums in Bangladesh
List of cricket grounds in Bangladesh

References

Football venues in Bangladesh
Cricket grounds in Bangladesh